The 2002–03 LEN Cup Winners' Cup is the ongoing 29th edition of LEN's second-tier competition for men's water polo clubs.

Quarter-finals

|}

Semi-finals

|}

Finals

|}

See also
2002–03 LEN Champions League

LEN Cup Winners' Cup seasons
Cup Winners' Cup
2002 in water polo
2003 in water polo